Urraween is a suburb of Hervey Bay in the Fraser Coast Region, Queensland, Australia. In the  Urraween had a population of 6,969 people.

Geography 
Urraween is a residential area. The Maryborough - Hervey Bay Road passes through the suburb from the south-west to the north-west. Urraween is a popular residential area due to its proximity to the public and private hospital. Yarrillee State School is in the north-west of the suburb and the Stocklands Hervey Bay shopping centre is in the north-east of the suburb.

History 
The name Urraween is derived from Kabi words ngur/uin meaning place of emus.

Prior to the development of Urraween the lands were used for agriculture which included a pineapple farm.

Hervey Bay Christian Academy opened in 1993.

Yarrilee State School opened in January 2000.

St James Lutheran College opened on 27 January 2003.

Education 
Yarrilee State School is a government primary (Prep-6) school for boys and girls at 15 Scrub Hill Road.  In 2016, the school had an enrolment of 769 students with 54 teachers (50 equivalent full-time) and 33 non-teaching staff (21 equivalent full-time). In 2017, the school had an enrolment of 791 students with 55 teachers (51 full-time equivalent) and 34 non-teaching staff (22 full-time equivalent). It includes a special education program.

St James Lutheran College is a private primary and secondary (Prep-12) school for boys and girls at 138-172 Pantlins Lane. In 2017, the school had an enrolment of 609 students with 43 teachers (41 full-time equivalent) and 34 non-teaching staff (26 full-time equivalent).

Bayside Christian College Hervey Bay is a private primary and secondary (Prep-12) school at 171 Pantlins Lane.

Amenities 
St James Lutheran Church is at 138-172 Pantlins Lane.

New Life Christian Church is at 225 Main Street.

Fraser Coast Baptist Church is at 175 Urraween Road (accessed via Pantlins Lane).

References

External links 

 

Fraser Coast Region